Adrian Geovana Nunes Gomes (born 5 April 1990) is a Brazilian female artistic gymnast and part of the national team.  She participated at the 2010 World Artistic Gymnastics Championships in Rotterdam, the Netherlands.

References

1990 births
Living people
Brazilian female artistic gymnasts
Place of birth missing (living people)
Gymnasts at the 2011 Pan American Games
Pan American Games competitors for Brazil
20th-century Brazilian women
21st-century Brazilian women